This list of listed buildings in Hernin Municipality lists listed buildings in Herning Municipality, Denmark.

The list

References

External links
 Danish Agency of Culture

Herning